Saptagiri Sankar Ulaka is a tribal Indian politician hailing from Rayagada, Koraput. He was elected to the 17th Lok Sabha, lower house of the Parliament of India from Koraput, Odisha in the 2019 Indian general election as a member of the Indian National Congress. It is to be noted that he currently is the only member from Odisha Congress in the Lok Sabha

Early life, Education, Career
Hailing from a politically active family of South Odisha belonging to the Jatapu community, Saptagiri's father Ramachandra Ulaka  was a two-time MP from Koraput, seven-time MLA from Rayagada. Saptagiri's mother Ratnamani Ulaka is a member of AICC and State vice President of Odisha Mahila Congress. Saptagiri is a software engineer by profession, as a Senior Project Manager, Infosys in the United States of America.He had also worked with top firms such as Ranbaxy, HCL Technologies etc. He has been instrumental in raising a voice for a High Court Bench in Undivided Koraput "Koraput MP Saptagiri Ulaka Urges Center For High Court Bench in Undivided Koraput" among many other issues that are pertinent to the welfare and development of Koraput. He isn't anti-industry as stated in an interview published in the Caravan magazine where he says "development has to happen. Yet, it has to be an inclusive process that takes cognisance of the Adivasi way of life." He has to been instrumental in getting air connectivity to his Parliamentary Constituency & South Odisha at large with repeated demands in the Lok Sabha for upgradation of the existing Jeypore airstrip into a full fledged commercial airport at Jeypore city. The Jeypore airport is currently scheduled for commercial operations by June 2022.

Saptagiri Sankar Ulaka is also a polyglot who is fluent in Kui,Odia,English,Telugu,Hindi & German. Saptagiri Sankar Ulaka is married to Smt Pooja Ulaka who is a social activist & social entrepreneur. The couple are blessed with twins Nandini & Ramachandra Ulaka.

References

1979 births
Living people
People from Rayagada district
India MPs 2019–present
Lok Sabha members from Odisha
Indian National Congress politicians from Odisha
People from Koraput district